Bradley's Beat is an EP by Richard D. James, under the alias Bradley Strider, released by Rephlex Records in 1995.

The record has a 1991 copyright date, but there is no reference to it on any Rephlex promotional copy until its 1995 press release. The Rephlex label often put out misinformation about their release catalogue, which may explain this. Three pressings of the single are known to exist. Although all three have the same A-side track, the B-sides vary on the first two pressings and the third pressing has a grooveless B-side.

1995 Pressings 
On the below pressing, side A plays at 45 rpm and side B plays at 33 ⅓ rpm.

On the below pressing, both sides play at 45 rpm.

1996 Pressing

References

Aphex Twin EPs
1995 EPs